The canton of Gagny is a French administrative division, located in the arrondissement of Le Raincy, in the Seine-Saint-Denis département (Île-de-France région). Its borders were modified at the French canton reorganisation which came into effect in March 2015. Its seat is in Gagny.

Composition 
It consists of the following communes:
 Gagny
 Neuilly-sur-Marne

Adjacent cantons 
 Canton of Livry-Gargan (north)
 Canton of Tremblay-en-France (northeast)
 Canton of Villemomble (west)
 Canton of Noisy-le-Grand (south)

See also
Cantons of the Seine-Saint-Denis department
Communes of the Seine-Saint-Denis department

References

Gagny